Glued laminated timber, commonly referred to as glulam, is a type of structural engineered wood product constituted by layers of dimensional lumber bonded together with durable, moisture-resistant structural adhesives so that all of the grain runs parallel to the longitudinal axis. In North America, the material providing the laminations is termed laminating stock or lamstock.

History 

The principles of glulam construction are believed to date back to the 1860s, in the assembly room of King Edward VI College, a school in Southampton, England. The first patent however emerged in 1901 when Otto Karl Freidrich Hetzer, a carpenter from Weimar, Germany, patented this method of construction. Approved in Switzerland, Hetzer’s patent explored creating a straight beam out of several laminations glued together. In 1906 he received a patent in Germany for curved sections of glulam. Other countries in Europe soon began approving patents and by 1922, glulam had been used in 14 countries. The technology was first brought to the United States by Max Hanisch Sr., who had been associated with the Hetzer firm in 1906 before emigrating to the United States in 1923. With no financial backing, it was not until 1934 that Hanisch was able to first use glulam in the United States. The project, a school and community gym in Peshtigo, Wisconsin, took time to get started, as manufacturers were hard to find, but eventually the Thompson Brothers Boat Manufacturing Company took on the project. The Wisconsin Industrial Commission, however, rejected the arches as they had no previous experience working with glulam. A compromise was reached in which the arches could be used if they were used in conjunction with bolts, lags, metal strapping, and angles to reinforce the structure. The partnership for this project lead to the creation of Unit Structures Inc., a construction firm for glulam owned by both the Hanisch and Thompson families. In 1936, Unit Structures patented both the forming equipment used to produce glulam arches and the glulam arches themselves. A second project, this time for the Forest Products Laboratory (FPL), gave Unit Structures the opportunity to prove the strength and stiffness of glulam members to architects and engineers. Full-scale load tests conducted by placing  of sandbags on the roof exceeded the design specs by 50%. The noted deflections were also in favor of the system. While the results took some time to get published, the test enabled Unit Structures to continue building with glulam. At this time, I-sections featuring plywood webs and glulam flanges became popular in Europe while rectangular sections became the norm in America. The I-sections saved on lumber, which was beneficial to Europeans as they had high lumber costs but were more labor intensive, which was expensive in the States. The glulam system piqued the interest of those on the west coast and many firms began to engage with it. In 1942, the introduction of a fully water-resistant phenol-resorcinol adhesive enabled glulam to be used in exposed exterior environments without concern of glue line degradation, expanding its applicable market. During the midst of World War II, glulam construction became more widespread as steel was needed for the war effort. In 1952, leading fabricators of engineered and solid wood joined forces to create the American Institute of Timber Construction (AITC) to help standardize the industry and promote its use. The first U.S. manufacturing standard for glulam was published by the Department of Commerce in 1963. Since then, glulam manufacturing has spread within the United States and into Canada and has been used for other structures, such as bridges, as well. It is currently standardized under ANSI Standard A190.1.

Manufacturing
The manufacturing of glulam is typically broken down into four steps: drying and grading the lumber, joining the lumber to form longer laminations, gluing the layers, and finishing and fabrication. The lumber used to produce glulam may come to the manufacturers pre-dried or will have to be dried onsite. A hand-held or on the line moisture meter is used to check the moisture levels of the lumber. Each piece of lumber going into the manufacturing process should have a moisture content between 8% and 14% in accordance with the adhesive used. If a piece of lumber is above this threshold it is redried. Once the lumber is dry, knots on the ends of the lumber are trimmed and grading occurs. Lumber is then grouped based on the grade. To create lengths of glulam longer than those typically available for sawn lumber, the lumber must be end-jointed. The most common joint for this is a finger joint, 1.1 in or 2.8 cm in length cut on either end with special cutter heads. A structural resin, typically RF curing melamine formaldehyde (MF) or PF resin, is applied to the joint between successive boards and cured under end pressure using a continuous RF curing system. After the resins have cured, the lumber is planed on each side to ensure smooth surfaces for gluing. Once planed, a glue extruder spreads the resin onto the lumber. This resin is most often phenol-resorcinol-formaldehyde, but PF resin or melamine-urea-formaldehyde (MUF) resin can also be used. For straight beams, the resinated lumber is stacked in a specific lay-up pattern in a clamping bed so that a mechanical or hydraulic system can press the lumber together. For curved beams, the same process occurs, but lumber is instead stacked in a curved form. These beams are cured at room temperature for 5–16 hours before the pressure is released unless the hydraulic pressure is combined with RF curing which can reduce the length of time needed for curing. Once the glulam beams are completely cured, they are removed from the clamping system the wide-side faces are sanded or planed to remove any resin that is squeezed out between the boards. The narrow top and bottom faces may also be sanded if necessary, based on the desired appearance. The corners are often rounded as well. Specifications for appearance govern whether or not additional finishing is completed. Additional finishing may include filling knot holes with putty, sanding the beams further, and applying sealers, finishes, or primers.

Technological developments

Resin glues 
When glued laminated timber was introduced to the building technology in the early twentieth century, casein glues, which are waterproof but have low shear strength, were widely used. Joints with casein glues had detachment failures due to inherent stresses in the wood. The invention of cold-curing synthetic resin glues in 1928 ("Kaurit") and other urea-formaldehyde glues solved these problems - resin glues, which are inexpensive and easy to use, are waterproof and enable high adhesive strength. The development of resin glues contributed to the wide use of glued laminated timber construction.

Finger joints 
The use of finger joints with glulam allowed for production of glulam beams and columns on large scale. Glulam finger joints were developed to provide broad surface area for gluing. Automatic finger-jointing machines help cut the finger joints, connect and glue them together under pressure, allowing for a strong, durable joint, capable of carrying high loads comparable to natural wood with the same cross-section.

Computer numerical control 
Computer numerical control (CNC) allows architects and designers to cut glued laminated timber into unusual shapes with a high degree of precision. CNC machine tools can utilize up to five axes, which enables undercutting and hollowing-out processes. The cost-effective CNC machines carve the material using mechanical tools, like a router.

Advantages 
There are several advantages to using glulam in construction:

 Size and shape - By laminating a number of smaller pieces of lumber into a single large structural member, the dimensions of glulam members are only limited by transport and handling rather than the size of a tree like sawn lumber. This also enables the use of smaller trees harvested from second-growth forests and plantations rather than relying on old-growth forests. Glulam can also be manufactured in a variety of shapes, so it offers architects artistic freedom without sacrificing structural requirements.
 Versatility - Because the size and shape of glulam members can be so variable, they are able to be used as both beams and columns.
 Strength and stiffness - Glulam has a higher strength to weight ratio compared to both concrete and steel. Glulam also reduces the impact defects in the wood have on the strength of the member making it stronger than sawn lumber as well.  Glulam has also been proven to have a higher resistance to lateral-torsional buckling than steel.
 Environmentally friendly - Glulam has much lower embodied energy than reinforced concrete and steel because the laminating process allows the timber to be used for much longer spans, heavier loads, and more complex shapes than reinforced concrete or steel. The embodied energy to produce it is one sixth of that of a comparable strength of steel. Also, as glulam is a wood product, it naturally sequesters carbon, keeping it from being released into the atmosphere.  As long as the wood used to manufacture the glulam members comes from a sustainably managed forest, glulam is a renewable resource. 
 Fire safety - While glulam is inherently flammable because it is made of wood, if it catches on fire a char layer forms that protects the interior of the member and thus maintains the strength of the member for some time.

Disadvantages 
As with any system, there are some drawbacks to using glulam:

 Material cost - Glulam is generally noted to be more costly than concrete at high axial loads, though this can depend on location and its abundance of either material. While glulam beams may be cheaper than HEA steel beams in some cases, it is not a significant difference.
 Moisture - Glulam, especially when used for bridge projects, is susceptible to changes in moisture which can impact its strength. When glulam was exposed to a number of wet/dry cycles, the bending strength decreased dramatically, 43.5%. 
 Dimensions - When compared to more common structural materials, glulam generally requires larger members to support the same load. Compared to steel, the cross-sectional area and height of a glulam member are significantly greater which may even make it impossible to use. Compared to concrete, glulam columns will be smaller for small axial loads, but once large axial forces come into play, concrete columns have a smaller cross-sectional area.
 Biodegradation - As a wood product, glulam is subject to concern regarding biodegradation. In regions where there is a high risk for biodegradation, additional measures to protect the glulam need to be taken.

Applications

Sport Structures 

Sport structures are a particularly suitable application for wide-span glulam roofs.  This is supported by the light weight of the material, combined with the ability to furnish long lengths and large cross-sections. Prefabrication is invariably employed, and the structural engineer needs to develop clear method statements for delivery and erection at an early stage in the design. The PostFinance Arena is an example of a wide-span sports stadium roof using glulam arches reaching up to 85 metres.  The structure was built in Bern in 1967, and has subsequently been refurbished and extended. Eastern Kentucky University's Alumni Coliseum was built in 1963 with the world's largest glued laminated arches, which span .

The roof of the Richmond Olympic Oval, built for speed skating events at the 2010 Winter Olympic Games in Vancouver, British Columbia, features one of the world's largest clearspan wooden structures. The roof includes 2,400 cubic metres of Douglas fir lamstock lumber in glulam beams. A total of 34 yellow-cedar glulam posts support the overhangs where the roof extends beyond the walls.

Anaheim Ice, located in Anaheim, California, is also an example of using glued laminated timber. Disney Development Company desired to build an aesthetic ice rink with less cost, and glulam was one of the most qualified materials in order to meet the owner's requirement. Architect Frank Gehry suggested a design with large double-curved Yellow pine glulam beams, and the ice rink was constructed in 1995.

Bridges 

Pressure-treated glulam timbers or timbers manufactured from naturally durable wood species are well suited for creating bridges and waterfront structures. Wood's ability to absorb impact forces created by traffic and its natural resistance to chemicals, such as those used for de-icing roadways, make it ideal for these installations.

Glulam has been successfully used for pedestrian, forest, highway, and railway bridges. One North American glulam bridge is Keystone Wye in the Black Hills of South Dakota, constructed in 1967. The da Vinci Bridge in Norway, completed in 2001, is almost completely constructed with glulam. The Kingsway Pedestrian Bridge in Burnaby, British Columbia, Canada, is constructed of cast-in-place concrete for the support piers, structural steel and glulam for the arch, a post tensioned precast concrete walking deck, and stainless steel support rods connecting the arch to the walking deck.

Religious buildings 

Glulam is used for the construction of multi-use facilities such as churches, school buildings, and libraries. The Cathedral of Christ the Light in Oakland, California, is one such example and uses glulam to enhance the ecological and aesthetic effect. It was built as the replacement of the Cathedral of Saint Francis de Sales, which became unusable after the Loma Prieta earthquake in 1989. The ,  vesica piscis-shaped building formed the frame with a glued-laminated timber beam and steel-rod skeleton covered with a glass skin. Considering the conventional way of construction with steel or reinforced concrete moment-frame, this glulam-and-steel combination case is regarded as an advanced way to realize the economy and aesthetic in the construction.

Other 

In 2019, the world's tallest structure employing the use of glulam was Mjøstårnet, an 18-story mixed-use building in Brumunddal, Norway. However, in 2022, the Ascent MKE building in Milwaukee, Wisconsin surpassed it with 26 stories, measuring over 86 meters tall.

The roof of the Centre Pompidou-Metz museum in France is composed of sixteen kilometers of glued laminated timber intersecting to form hexagonal units. With a surface area of 8,000 m2, the irregular geometry of the roof, featuring various curves and counter-curves, resembles aChinese hat.

Failures
In 2005, researchers at Lund University, Sweden, found a number of failures of glulam structures in Scandinavian countries. They concluded that construction faults or design errors were responsible.
In January 2002 the roof of the Siemens velodrome arena in Copenhagen collapsed when  a joint between glulam trusses failed at the point of its dowel fastenings. 
In February  2003 the roof of a newly built exhibition hall in Jyväskylä, Finland, collapsed. It was found that during construction the specified number of dowels at joints between glulam timbers were missing or had been wrongly placed.

The collapse of the Perkolo bridge in Sjoa, Norway, in 2016 was caused by a design miscalculation of stresses at joints. Following this incident thirteen road bridges of glulam construction were checked, with only minor faults found.

On 15 August 2022 Tretten Bridge in Gudbrandsdalen, Norway, collapsed as two vehicles were crossing. It was made with glulam and steel construction and had been erected in 2012, with a design life of "at least 100 years". The cause of the failure was not immediately apparent, although during the 2016 inspection , one joint was found to have dowels that were too short.

See also 
 Engineered Wood
 Cross laminated timber
 Fiberboard
 Hardboard
 I joist
 Laminated veneer lumber
 Masonite
 Medium-density fiberboard
 Oriented strand board
 Parallam
 Particle board
 Plastic composite (disambiguation)
 Plywood
 Pressed wood
 Timber framing
 Plyscraper
 Tretten Bridge collapse (2022)

References

External links 
 Glulam Beam Repair/Reinforcement – An article (Printed in STRUCTURE magazine, Sep. 2006) by Gary W. Gray P.E. and Paul C. Gilham P.E.
 Timber Engineering Europe Glulam
 Canadian Wood Council Glulam

Composite materials
Engineered wood
Timber framing